Henidar-e Ebrahim Khan (also Romanized as Henīdar-e Ebrāhīm Khān; also known as Hendū-ye Soflā and Henīdar-e Soflá) is a village in Howmeh-ye Sarpol Rural District, in the Central District of Sarpol-e Zahab County, Kermanshah Province, Iran. At the 2006 census, its population was 40, in 7 families.

References 

Populated places in Sarpol-e Zahab County